Panchelonioidea is a clade of marine turtles that includes the sea turtles and related taxa.

Phylogeny 
Evers et al. (2019):

References

Cryptodira